NCE may stand for:
 Newark College of Engineering, a part of the New Jersey Institute of Technology
 New chemical entity, an investigational drug
 New Civil Engineer, the weekly magazine of the Institution of Civil Engineers
 Nigerian Certificate in Education
 Non-commercial educational radio broadcasting
 The IATA code for Nice Côte d'Azur Airport
 Normal curve equivalent, a statistical measure related to percentile rank
 The National Counselor Examination for Licensure and Certification of the National Board for Certified Counselors
 New Clee railway station, England; National Rail station code NCE.